Daniele Granata (born 13 June 1991, in Ortona) is an Italian footballer who plays as a defender for S.S. Teramo Calcio on loan from Pescara.

References

External links
 

1991 births
Living people
People from Ortona
Italian footballers
Association football defenders
Delfino Pescara 1936 players
Casale F.B.C. players
Giulianova Calcio players
S.S. Teramo Calcio players
Sportspeople from the Province of Chieti
Footballers from Abruzzo